Canton of Marseille – Notre-Dame-du-Mont is a former canton located within the commune of Marseille in the Bouches-du-Rhône department of France. It was created 27 February 2003 by the decree 2003-156 of that date. It was disbanded following the French canton reorganisation which came into effect in March 2015. Its population was 32,980 in 2012.

Elected to represent the canton in the General Council of Bouches-du-Rhône'' : 
 Joseph Zeitoun (PS, 2001-2008)

Area
It was composed of the part of the 5th municipal arrondissement of Marseille situated west of rue Auguste-Blanqui (included), rue Saint-Pierre (included), boulevard Jean-Moulin (excluded), boulevard Baille, rue du Berceau, avenue de Toulon and a part of the 6th municipal arrondissement not part of the canton of Marseille-Vauban.

See also 
 Arrondissement of Marseille
 Cantons of the Bouches-du-Rhône department
 Communes of the Bouches-du-Rhône department

References

Former cantons of Marseille
Marseille - Notre-Dame-du-Mont
2015 disestablishments in France
States and territories disestablished in 2015
2003 establishments in France